The Mad River is a  mountain brook on the Maine–New Hampshire border in the United States, within the eastern White Mountains. It is a tributary of the Cold River, part of the Saco River watershed.

The river quickly drops to the south down the slopes of Royce Mountain, entering Maine and dropping over Mad River Falls, a  cascade. The river joins the Cold River in the floor of Evans Notch, a narrow pass through the White Mountains.

See also

List of rivers of Maine
List of rivers of New Hampshire

References

Rivers of Maine
Rivers of New Hampshire
Saco River
Rivers of Oxford County, Maine